Mabel Memorial Chapel is located in Harrisonburg, Virginia and was built in 1898. It is located in the former village of Chestnut Ridge.

History

Origin
U.S. Naval Surgeon Lucien Guy Heneberger provided all the building materials and much of the labor. He asked that the chapel be named in honor of his wife Mabel Grymes Heneberger who died after giving birth to their first child. Heneberger also built Mabel Memorial Schoolhouse, a one-room school, adjacent to the Mabel Memorial Chapel.

The land for the chapel, schoolhouse, and cemetery was donated by Moses Wenger in 1898. The deed was registered in the Clerk’s Office on November 3, 1898, and was held in trust with the Presbyterian Church of Harrisonburg and Presbyterian Church of USA (PCUSA).

Outdoor services were reportedly held for up to a decade before the doors of the chapel opened in 1899. Services were held in the chapel for 108 years.

Accounts report that the chapel’s bell was recovered from another chapel that burned down during the Civil War period. A letter from David Edwards of Virginia Department of Historic Resources makes note of this.

A history of the chapel dated 1946 by “Miss Virginia Converse, Mrs. Hugh Tobin, Committee, Miss Harriet Garber, Historian” records the aforementioned historical information in addition to other information detailing the founders and benefactors of the chapel, in particular the charity and generosity of Lucien G. Heneberger.

In a meeting report of the First Presbyterian Church of Harrisonburg dated August 1, 1974, the state of affairs of the chapel were discussed and a contract was agreed upon to deed the property to the congregation of Mabel Memorial after a period of three to five years under the conditions that it: be used for religious purposes, assume the full responsibility of obtaining a minister and conducting their own religious services, and maintain the upkeep of the cemetery.

First Presbyterian Church of Harrisonburg did not deed the chapel to the Mabel Memorial congregation as agreed, although the stipulated conditions were met and the agreement fully upheld. The Mabel Memorial congregation was unaware that the agreement was not upheld. The members invested in many improvements (central heating and air, new shutters, new lighting, the addition of a Fellowship Hall etc.) with the understanding that the property had been deeded to them.

Recent Closing and Controversy

In fall 2006, the more than century old metal roof began to leak. The Mabel Memorial Chapel congregation informed First Presbyterian Church of the roof leak and inquired about using the chapel’s trust funds for repairs. First Presbyterian Church declined offers made to repair the chapel at no cost. Soon after Easter services 2007, the mostly elderly congregation was locked out of their chapel by First Presbyterian Church. For a while, the Mabel Memorial Chapel congregation continued to hold services outside of their chapel in hopes that First Presbyterian Church of Harrisonburg would re-open the doors to the historic chapel.

On numerous occasions First Presbyterian Church of Harrisonburg has been contacted by news media, the Virginia Department of Historic Resources, and Mabel Memorial Congregation members and has refused to comment or respond. Despite John Sloop’s statement of support in the December 23, 2010 issue of the Daily News Record, “The church supports the effort to erect a state historic marker, Sloop said. ‘We’re all for history,’ Sloop said, ‘and celebrating the ministry of the church at that chapel.’”, no paperwork has been returned from First Presbyterian Church to the Virginia Department of Historic Resources.

After being closed for more than 6 years, FPC’s policy of demolition by neglect, is taking its toll on the Historic Mabel Memorial Chapel. While Mabel Memorial Chapel survived the 53"+ inches of snow during the blizzard of winter 2009-2010, the aesthetics of the structure, such as the beauty of the woodwork and interior, are being compromised due to negligence. However, as seen by the perseverance of the building through extreme weather, it remains very structurally sound. After its closing, two class A contractors inspected Mabel Memorial Chapel finding it in excellent condition stating that it only needed work done on its 100+ year old roof.

Hundreds of acres of the area of Chestnut Ridge have been cleared for commercial construction, student housing and other apartment complexes. Most of Mabel Memorial’s congregation were displaced by this commercial development and road construction project. Despite the fact that the majority of members lost their homes Mabel Memorial congregation remained solvent and active. While Mabel Memorial Chapel congregation had an excess of $20,000 dollars in the offering account (according to MMC treasurer) and a total of over $53,000 dollars bequeathed in trust held by First Presbyterian Church of Harrisonburg (according to FPC accounting), the Presbyterian Church of USA has done nothing to protect Mabel Memorial congregation and has allowed First Presbyterian Church of Harrisonburg to move them out and market the property for commercial redevelopment.

A review of the trust account information reveals the following:

  Flavia Converse Amount in Fund: $36,059.32

  Edwin R.G. Heneberger Amount in Fund: $2,587.74

  Lucien G. Heneberger Amount in Fund: 250 oz of gold (According to oral history 
  Lucien G. Heneberger left 250 ounces of gold in his will to Mabel Memorial Chapel 
  & Schoolhouse for the upkeep or expansion of these buildings; a review of his will in 
  the Rockingham County Courthouse confirmed this).

  Mary & Benjamin Leake Amount in Fund: $4,217.70

The chapel remains threatened with demolition due to the large scale commercial development in the area. Despite approval to be listed on the national register of historic places, the adjacent Mabel Memorial Schoolhouse was demolished July 2013. The first application to landmark the Mabel Memorial Chapel was filed in 2007 with the Virginia Department of Historic Resources. To date, the Commonwealth of Virginia has taken no action to protector landmark the Mabel Memorial Chapel. Another application is being prepared and will be presented to the Department of Historic Resources soon.

External links
 Save Mabel

References

Presbyterian churches in Virginia
Buildings and structures in Harrisonburg, Virginia
Churches completed in 1898